The Indian Institute of Islamic Studies is an Islamic studies institute, in New Delhi. Established in 1963, by prominent Muslim leaders including Hakeem Abdul Hameed, who later founded the Jamia Hamdard university, the Institute entrusted to preserve the Islamic tradition and culture in India. In addition to this institute also promoting studies and research in Islam as well as comparative studies. It is the repository of many collections on Islam, mostly written in Persian and Arabic languages, and also publishes a quarterly journal, Studies in Islam 

The institute was also instrumental in the funding of Delhi-based, India Islamic Cultural Centre (IICC) in 1984.

References

External links
 Books published by Indian Institute of Islamic Studies

Islam in India
Organisations based in Delhi
Organizations established in 1963
Islamic studies
Education in Delhi
Academic publishing
1963 establishments in Delhi